Matthew Mark Maleafou Anesi MacKenzie (born July 24, 1979) is a Samoan former American football fullback who played in the National Football League (NFL) in 2003.

Career
MacKenzie played football at Capistrano Valley High School in Mission Viejo, California. He then continued his career at the University of Southern California. Due to injury and personal hardships (death of a parent), the NCAA granted him a second redshirt year, allowing him to remain on the squad for a total of six years.

In 2003 he was picked by the Jacksonville Jaguars.

In September 2004 he was released by the Patriots.

References

External links
TSN Profile

1979 births
Living people
Samoan players of American football
American football fullbacks
USC Trojans football players
Jacksonville Jaguars players
Samoan emigrants to the United States
People from Apia